Abdul Karim Jassim Bader (born 15 May 1956), also known as Jombi, is an Iraqi football coach and former player.

Personal life 
He is son of former Iraqi international player Jassim Bader.

Honours

Player
Al-Ittihad
Iraq Division One: 1980–81

Manager
Al-Minaa
Iraqi Premier League runner-up: 2004–05
Peace and Friendship Cup: 2004–05

Al-Ramtha
Jordan FA Cup runner-up: 1997

Al-Tali'aa Taizz
Yemeni League runner-up: 1999–00

References

External links
 

1951 births
Living people
Association football midfielders
Iraqi footballers
Al-Mina'a SC players
Al-Ittihad SC players
Al-Quwa Al-Jawiya players
Sportspeople from Basra
Iraq international footballers
Iraqi football managers
Expatriate football managers in Jordan
Expatriate football managers in Yemen
Al-Mina'a SC managers
Al-Ramtha SC managers
Iraqi expatriate sportspeople in Yemen
Iraqi expatriate sportspeople in Jordan
Iraqi expatriate football managers
Al-Ahli SC (Amman) managers
Jordanian Pro League managers
Iraqi Premier League managers